Latirulus fasciatus is a species of sea snail, a marine gastropod mollusk in the family Fasciolariidae, the spindle snails, the tulip snails and their allies.

Description
The snails are small, with their shells averaging 60 millimeters long. The shells can be white, with thin brown stripes going around the circumference of their shells, or a mottled brown. They live in island areas in the Pacific Ocean, such as in Hawaii or Japan.

Distribution

References

Fasciolariidae
Gastropods described in 1968